Diarmuid Wilson (born 20 November 1965) is an Irish Fianna Fáil politician who has served as a Senator for the Administrative Panel since September 2002.

A member of Cavan County Council from 1999 to 2004, he was first elected to the Seanad in 2002 and was re-elected in 2007 and 2011. He is the nephew of John Wilson, who was a TD, Minister and Tánaiste. He is the Fianna Fáil whip in the Seanad and spokesperson for Labour Affairs, Trade and Commerce.

See also
Families in the Oireachtas

References

External links
Diarmuid Wilson's page on the Fianna Fáil website

1965 births
Living people
Alumni of St Patrick's College, Maynooth
Alumni of Brunel University London
Fianna Fáil senators
Local councillors in County Cavan
Members of the 22nd Seanad
Members of the 23rd Seanad
Members of the 24th Seanad
Members of the 25th Seanad
Members of the 26th Seanad